Michael McEachern (born June 8, 1986) is a current professional Flag Football player in the Dynasty Football league for team Southside & former professional Canadian football defensive back who played for the BC Lions. He was drafted by the Lions of the Canadian Football League in the third round of the 2008 CFL Draft. He played college football for the Western Illinois Leathernecks. He is the son of former CFL All Star Ken McEachern who played strong safety for the Saskatchewan Roughriders and the Toronto Argonauts.

External links
BC Lions bio

1986 births
Living people
BC Lions players
Canadian football defensive backs
Canadian football people from Calgary
Players of Canadian football from Alberta
Western Illinois Leathernecks football players